Geomysaprinus is a genus of clown beetles in the family Histeridae. There are at least 20 described species in Geomysaprinus.

Species
 Geomysaprinus audax (Casey, 1893)
 Geomysaprinus belioculus (Marseul, 1862)
 Geomysaprinus bicirculus (Marseul, 1870)
 Geomysaprinus castanipennis (Fall, 1919)
 Geomysaprinus cheyennensis (Casey, 1916)
 Geomysaprinus copei (Horn, 1873)
 Geomysaprinus floridae (Horn, 1873)
 Geomysaprinus formicus (Hinton, 1935)
 Geomysaprinus goffi Ross, 1940
 Geomysaprinus lanei (McGrath and Hatch, 1941)
 Geomysaprinus laramiensis (Casey, 1893)
 Geomysaprinus moniliatus (Casey, 1916)
 Geomysaprinus oblongus (Wenzel, 1944)
 Geomysaprinus obscurus (J. L. LeConte, 1851)
 Geomysaprinus obsidianus (Casey, 1893)
 Geomysaprinus obsoletus (Casey, 1916)
 Geomysaprinus paeminosus (J. L. LeConte, 1851)
 Geomysaprinus parumpunctatus (J. L. LeConte, 1859)
 Geomysaprinus pectoralis (J. L. LeConte, 1851)
 Geomysaprinus pinorum (Casey, 1924)
 Geomysaprinus posthumus (Marseul, 1855)
 Geomysaprinus quaesitus (Lewis, 1888)
 Geomysaprinus rugosifrons (Fall, 1919)
 Geomysaprinus saulnieri Kovarik and Verity in Kovarik, Verity and Mitchell, 1999
 Geomysaprinus subtropicus (Casey, 1924)
 Geomysaprinus suffusus (Casey, 1916)
 Geomysaprinus tibialis Ross, 1940
 Geomysaprinus triangulifer (Marseul, 1855)

References

 Mazur, Slawomir (1997). "A world catalogue of the Histeridae (Coleoptera: Histeroidea)". Genus, International Journal of Invertebrate Taxonomy (Supplement), 373.

Further reading

 Arnett, R. H. Jr., M. C. Thomas, P. E. Skelley and J. H. Frank. (eds.). (21 June 2002). American Beetles, Volume II: Polyphaga: Scarabaeoidea through Curculionoidea. CRC Press LLC, Boca Raton, Florida .
 Arnett, Ross H. (2000). American Insects: A Handbook of the Insects of America North of Mexico. CRC Press.
 Richard E. White. (1983). Peterson Field Guides: Beetles. Houghton Mifflin Company.

Histeridae